Isadore Borsuk (November 4, 1927 – September 19, 2016), better known as Bobby Breen, was a Canadian-born American actor and singer. He was a popular male child singer during the 1930s and reached major popularity with film and radio appearances.

Early life
Breen was born Isadore Borsuk on November 4, 1927 (according to some sources he was born in 1928) in Montréal, Canada, the son of Hyman (Chaim) and Rebecca Borsuk. His parents were poor Jewish immigrants from present-day Ukraine. They, along with Breen's three older siblings (Gertrude, Sally, and Michael), migrated from Kiev to Montreal, Quebec, Canada, in 1927. Soon after, they relocated to Toronto. His singing talent as a boy soprano was discovered at age three by his sister Sally, herself an aspiring musical student who was several years his senior. While their parents did not show any particular interest, Sally decided to help him achieve stardom. With the assistance from her music teacher, Breen got a chance to perform in front of an audience in a nightclub. Soon, he began winning prizes in theatre competitions, providing significant amount of income to the poor family. Due to his gained popularity, the two siblings decided to look for work and recognition in the United States. Financed by Sally, they traveled to Chicago by bus in 1934, where he began working with people such as Gloria Swanson and Milton Berle in local theater productions. Breen later relocated to New York City. The foreign-sounding last name of Borsuk had been anglicised to Breen prior to their arrival in the United States.

Child star at RKO

Breen went to Hollywood in 1935, where he received singing lessons from a vocal coach. Film producer Sol Lesser, who had discovered Jackie Coogan, signed Breen to RKO Radio Pictures. Around this time, he became a regular performer on Eddie Cantor's weekly radio show in 1936, where his talents as a boy soprano were appreciated by the listeners. Prior to the release of his first motion picture, Let's Sing Again, he was compared to other child stars of the era such as Freddie Bartholomew and Shirley Temple. In terms of his vocalist abilities, he was described as a combination of Allan Jones, Nelson Eddy and Al Jolson. His debut saw him being top-billed with Henry Armetta as his co-star. He sang La donna è mobile, among other songs, in the movie. He also signed a contract with Decca Records and had moderate success with a series of 78 rpm records in the late 1930s. The title song from Let's Sing Again (Decca 798) would become a national hit, charting at #14 in the summer of 1936. By the 21st century, Breen was the only male artist with a pre-World War II hit record still living (Rose Marie, who charted as an eight-year-old in 1932 with "Say That You Were Teasing Me", died in 2017, a year after Breen).

Satisfied with his debut for the studio, RKO signed a deal with him for three additional movies. He was cast in another musical later the same year called Rainbow on the River, co-starring May Robson and Alan Mowbray. He sang Ave Maria and the film's title song Rainbow on the River. Kurt Neumann, who had directed Breen in his first two pictures, worked with him for the last time in Make a Wish in 1937. His co-star was Basil Rathbone. In a 1938 article, he was referred to as one of the rare cases of child actors succeeding in an adult-dominated industry.

By the time he had completed filming Escape to Paradise in 1939, his voice was gradually changing due to puberty. As a result, he retired from the film industry, despite being originally contracted for two additional movies, and instead focused on his education at Beverly Hills High School. He described the sudden voice change in a 1977 article:

His popularity did not immediately wane during his hiatus, receiving mail from numerous fans across the United States and United Kingdom. He briefly returned to the screen in 1942 to appear as himself in Johnny Doughboy, starring Jane Withers. As an adult, he expressed skepticism about children working in the entertainment industry.

In the military
Breen enlisted in the infantry in the U.S. Army during World War II. He and fellow Hollywood actor Mickey Rooney were soon assigned to entertain the troops, despite him having retired from show business. Breen was hospitalized in France in 1945 towards the end of the war. For his war efforts, he was awarded the Bronze Star Medal.

Adult years
After his discharge from the U.S. Army, in 1946, he initially struggled to find work as he returned to show business. He did some theatre work  as well as some radio appearances in New York during this period. Because of his voice having changed since becoming an adult, he took singing lessons to reinvent himself by adapting to a new tenor singing style.

Throughout the 1950s and 1960s, he worked as a singer in nightclubs and as a musical performer in stock theatre, later serving as a guest pianist for the NBC Symphony Orchestra on radio, and hosting a local TV show in New York. He also recorded briefly for the Motown label, singing on two singles and produced an unreleased album in 1964 called Better Late Than Never. Berry Gordy had hoped for Breen to become his first white contracted artist, but ultimately changed his mind because the singer did not suit the type of music Motown produced. In 1953, Breen appeared on ABC's reality show, The Comeback Story, to explain how his career nose-dived as he entered his teen years and how he fought to recover.

Since the 1970s, he and his wife Audrey had been working in Florida as entrepreneurs, booking agents and producers arranging musical shows performed by various entertainers at smaller, affordable venues. The business idea is called a "condominium circuit". In later years, it has focused on hiring aged stars of the past, including Debbie Reynolds, Mickey Rooney and Ann Blyth.

Personal life
In November 1948, he went missing while on a private flight from Waukesha, Wisconsin, to Hayward, Wisconsin. Several planes went searching for him for a day and a half before it was discovered that he had been staying at a hotel anonymously without telling anyone. He was fined 300 U.S. dollars.

Breen married fashion model Jocelyn Lesh on November 9, 1952. The couple had a son, Hunter Keith Breen, in 1954. Four years later, the marriage became unsustainable, with Jocelyn claiming that he had physically injured her. They went their separate ways, but the divorce was not finalized until February 1961. He married the president of the City of Hope National Medical Center, Audrey Howard, in around 1962.

He lived with his family in Tamarac, Florida, and worked as the owner/operator of Bobby Breen Enterprises, a local talent agency. Starting in 2002, he made occasional concert appearances.

His sister Sally died in 1999. That same year, he underwent bypass surgery due to blocked arteries in his heart.

Death
He died of natural causes in Pompano Beach, Florida, on September 19, 2016, three days following the death of his wife.

Awards
On February 12, 2012, he was the recipient of the "Forest Trace Honorary Octogenarian: Turn Back Time" award.

Filmography

In popular culture
Breen was one of the people represented on the cover of The Beatles' album Sgt. Pepper's Lonely Hearts Club Band. He found his inclusion on the album cover surprising.
Lenny Bruce mentioned Breen in his comedy routine "The Palladium".

References

Further reading

Holmstrom, John (1996). The Moving Picture Boy: An International Encyclopaedia from 1895 to 1995. Norwich, Michael Russell, pp. 153–154.
 Dye, David (1988). Child and Youth Actors: Filmography of Their Entire Careers, 1914-1985. Jefferson, NC: McFarland & Co.,  pp. 25–26.

External links

Bobby Breen at the American Film Institute

1927 births
2016 deaths
Boy sopranos
American male child actors
Apex Records artists
Canadian emigrants to the United States
Canadian people of Ukrainian-Jewish descent
Jewish American male actors
Jewish Canadian male actors
Jewish Canadian musicians
National Recording Corporation artists
American people of Ukrainian-Jewish descent
Male actors from Montreal
Musicians from Montreal
People from Tamarac, Florida
21st-century American Jews
Decca Records artists